Bob Lanigan is an Australian rugby league footballer who played in the 1960s.  He played for Newtown in the New South Wales Rugby League (NSWRL) competition.

Playing career
Lanigan made his first grade debut for Newtown in 1965.  The club would go on to finish 6th on the table and Lanigan finished as the club's top point scorer with 63 points.

In 1966, Newtown finished 4th on the table and reached the finals for the first time since 1962.  Newtown were beaten by Manly-Warringah in the semi final 10–9 at the Sydney Cricket Ground.  Lanigan finished as the competition's top point scorer with 185 points.

In Langian's last 2 seasons at Newtown, the club finished 9th in 1967 and last in 1968.  Lanigan finished both seasons as the club's top point scorer and 5th highest point scorer in the club's history.  In 1969, Lanigan departed Newtown and became captain-coach of the Griffith Waratahs.

References

Living people
Newtown Jets players
Australian rugby league coaches
Australian rugby league players
Rugby league players from Sydney
Rugby league wingers
Year of birth missing (living people)
Place of birth missing (living people)